Giuseppe Spinelli (21 November 1908 – 17 January 1987) was an Italian politician. He was born in Cremona. He was mayor of Milan. He joined the Italian Social Republic, where he served as Minister of Labour from 15 January to 25 April 1945. After the war, he fled to Argentina, where he became an advisor to Juan Domingo Perón.

References

1908 births
1987 deaths
20th-century Italian politicians
People of the Italian Social Republic
Mayors of Milan